Sciota fumella is a species of snout moth in the genus Sciota. It was described by Eduard Friedrich Eversmann in 1844. It is found in France, Switzerland, Austria, Italy, Poland, the Czech Republic, Slovakia, Hungary, Slovenia, Romania, Ukraine, Russia, Finland and the Baltic region.

The wingspan is about 20–24 mm.

References

Moths described in 1844
Phycitini
Moths of Europe